Sarangan is an urban village in Plaosan District, Magetan Regency in East Java Province. Its population is 3391.

Climate
Sarangan has a subtropical highland climate (Cfb). It has moderate rainfall from June to September and heavy to very heavy rainfall from October to May.

References

Villages in East Java